Hector Leak CBE (23 July 1887 – 5 April 1976) was a British statistician.  He was appointed a CBE in 1942. He was also the president of the Royal Statistical Society during a short period in 1941. Awarded the silver Guy Medal in 1940.

References 

1887 births
1976 deaths
Commanders of the Order of the British Empire
Presidents of the Royal Statistical Society